Gautam Sharma is an Indian television and film actor.

Sharma was raised in Bangalore. His father is a businessman. He completed his high school education from Frank Anthony Public School, Bangalore and graduated from St Joseph's College of Commerce, Bangalore.

He modelled before debuting with the show Grihasti, where he played a cameo role. He played the lead role in the television series Shakuntala. He played the role of Arjuna in Dwarkadheesh- Bhagwan Shree Krishn. He then played the role of Bablu Patel on Jamai Raja.

Filmography

References

External links
 

Living people
Indian male soap opera actors
Indian male television actors
Male actors from Bangalore
21st-century Indian male actors
Male actors in Hindi television
Year of birth missing (living people)